Olha Hennadiyivna Kharlan (born 4 September 1990) is a Ukrainian right-handed sabre fencer.

Kharlan is a two-time team European champion, six-time individual European champion, two-time team world champion, and four-time individual world champion.

A four-time Olympian, Kharlan is a 2016 team Olympic silver medalist, 2008 team Olympic champion, and two-time individual Olympic bronze medalist. Kharlan competed in the 2008 Beijing Olympic Games, the 2012 London Olympic Games, the 2016 Rio de Janeiro Olympic Games, and the 2020 Tokyo Olympic Games.

Kharlan was named athlete of the year at the 2009 Ukrainian Heroes of Sports Year awards. She briefly pursued a political career.

Personal life
Kharlan was born in Mykolaiv, a shipbuilding town in the south of Ukraine. Her father was a sailing and swimming coach, and taught her to swim when she was still a baby. He also moonlighted as a construction worker and a cab driver. Her mother worked as a painter and plasterer.

Kharlan first interest was in dancing, but the lessons were too expensive for her parents. When she was 10, her godfather, sabre coach Anatoly Shlikar, suggested she take up fencing, where the lessons were free. She came under the training of Artem Skorokhod, who remains her coach as of 2014. Her first success was the national Junior title, won when she was only 13 against teenagers up to five years older.

Kharlan was educated at the Admiral Makarov National University of Shipbuilding in Mykolaiv. She married fellow sabre fencer Dmytro Boiko in August 2014. They divorced later. She is currently dating Italian fencer Luigi Samele and they live in Bologna, Italy.

Sports career
Kharlan joined the Ukrainian national team at the age of 14. Her first medal in an international competition was a bronze in the 2005 Junior World Championships in Linz. she also took a silver medal in the team event. That same year, she reached the quarter-finals in the 2005 European Fencing Championships at Zalaegerszeg despite still being a cadet. In 2006, she placed second in the 2006 European Seniors Fencing Championship at İzmir after a close 14–15 defeat against Russia's Sofiya Velikaya.

At the age of 17 Kharlan took part in the 2008 Summer Olympics at Beijing. In the team event, Ukraine made their way to the final, where they met China. Kharlan contributed more than half her team's hits and proved decisive in the last bout helping Ukraine win the gold medal.

In the 2008–09 season Kharlan won the gold medal at the European Championships in Plovdiv both in the individual and the team event, where Ukraine overcame Russia. At the World Championships in Antalya, Kharlan once again made her way to the final, only to be stopped by Mariel Zagunis. She was described as "one of the most precocious talents in this category. She is already steady and consistent, but above all she is the star of the future." In the team event, Ukraine defeated France in the final to come away with the gold medal. For this performance Kharlan and her team were named respectively athlete and team of the year at the Ukrainian Heroes of Sports Year ceremony held in April 2010.

In the 2009–10 season Kharlan won her fourth Junior World Championship in a row, equalling the record established by Jacques Brodin in the 1960s. She is however the only fencer to have claimed these consecutive golds both in the individual and team events. She was defeated by Germany's Sibylle Klemm in the quarter-finals of the European Championships and failed to earn a medal. In the team event Ukraine won gold after beating Russia once again in the final.

Kharlan was offered Russian citizenship and an opportunity to compete for Russia in 2012, but refused.

In the 2013 World Championships Kharlan made her way to the final after defeating reigning Olympic champion Kim Ji-yeon in a tight 15–14 bout. She took an early 8–1 lead in the bout against Yekaterina Dyachenko of Russia, who managed to get back to 12–12. Kharlan then struck three hits in a row to win her first individual World title. In the team event Ukraine met once again Russia in the final. After a very tight match Kharlan managed a comeback in the last leg and received her second gold medal in the competition. She finished the season No.1 in world rankings for the first time of her career and she was inducted in the hall of fame of the International Fencing Federation.

In the 2013–14 season Kharlan won four World Cups out of seven competitions in which she took part. At the European Championships in Strasbourg she earned her fourth European gold medal in a row and the fifth of her career after defeating Dyachenko again in the final. In the team event she had to rescue her team against underdogs Spain in the quarter-finals, scraping a 45–43 victory, but could not prevent a 45–30 defeat at the hands of France. Kharlan's contribution proved once again decisive in the match against Poland and Ukraine came away with a bronze medal. In the World Championships Kharlan won her second title in a row after prevailing 15–12 over No.2 seed Zagunis. In the team event, Ukraine were defeated by 44–45 by the United States and met Italy for the third place. Again Kharlan came back in the last leg to win her team a bronze medal. She finished the season No.1 in rankings for the second time in a row.

At the 2016 Summer Olympics, she bested French competitor Manon Brunet for the bronze medal, with a score of 15–10.

At the 2020 Olympic Games in Tokyo Kharlan lost to China's Yang Hengyu in the first round.

Medal record

Olympic Games

World Championship

European Championship

Grand Prix

Political career
In the 2010 Ukrainian local elections Kharlan was elected a member of the Mykolaiv City Council for Party of Regions despite living in Kyiv. She was notoriously absent during its sessions. She was standing for election to the Ukrainian Parliament in the October 2012 Ukrainian parliamentary election but due to a 194th place on the list of Party of Regions she was not elected. Kharlan left the Party of Regions faction in the Mykolaiv City Council late March 2014. In May 2014 she was a candidate for the Party of Greens of Ukraine in the Kyiv local election; but the party did not manage to overcome the 3% election threshold and thus did not win any seats in the Kyiv City Council. The website of the Party of Greens of Ukraine claimed Kharlan was third on its election list in the October 2012 Ukrainian parliamentary election.

During the 2014 Crimean crisis and the 2014 pro-Russian conflict in Ukraine Kharlan spoke out for a united Ukraine. In March 2014 Ukrainian fencers boycotted the Moscow World Cup tournament in response to the death of a Ukrainian soldier in the Simferopol incident. They however took part in July 2014 in the 2014 World Fencing Championships in the Russian city of Kazan.

Notes

References

External links

 
  (archive)
 
 
 
 Small BBC documentary

1990 births
Living people
Sportspeople from Mykolaiv
Ukrainian female sabre fencers
Fencers at the 2008 Summer Olympics
Fencers at the 2012 Summer Olympics
Fencers at the 2016 Summer Olympics
Olympic fencers of Ukraine
Olympic gold medalists for Ukraine
Olympic silver medalists for Ukraine
Olympic bronze medalists for Ukraine
Olympic medalists in fencing
Party of Regions politicians
Party of Greens of Ukraine politicians
Ukrainian sportsperson-politicians
Medalists at the 2016 Summer Olympics
Medalists at the 2012 Summer Olympics
Medalists at the 2008 Summer Olympics
Fencers at the 2015 European Games
European Games medalists in fencing
European Games gold medalists for Ukraine
Universiade medalists in fencing
Universiade gold medalists for Ukraine
Universiade silver medalists for Ukraine
Medalists at the 2011 Summer Universiade
Medalists at the 2013 Summer Universiade
Fencers at the 2020 Summer Olympics
Laureates of the Prize of the Cabinet of Ministers of Ukraine for special achievements of youth in the development of Ukraine
20th-century Ukrainian women
21st-century Ukrainian women